Chalmers, originally Port Chalmers, was a parliamentary electorate in the Otago Region of New Zealand, from 1866 to 1938 with a break from 1896 to 1902. It was named after the town of Port Chalmers, the main port of Dunedin and Otago.

Population centres
In the 1865 electoral redistribution, the House of Representatives focussed its review of electorates to South Island electorates only, as the Central Otago Gold Rush had caused significant population growth, and a redistribution of the existing population. Fifteen additional South Island electorates were created, including Port Chalmers, and the number of Members of Parliament was increased by 13 to 70.

History
Port Chalmers was first established in 1866 for the term of the 4th New Zealand Parliament. The electorate was abolished again for the last time in 1938.

Due to World War II, the 1941 census was postponed. The next census was brought forward to 1945 so that the significant changes in population since the 1936 census could be taken into consideration in a 1946 electoral redistribution prior to the scheduled 1946 general election. At the same time, the Labour government abolished the country quota. The electoral redistribution changed all 76 electorates. When the draft electoral redistribution was released for consultation in early April 1946, it was proposed for the  electorate to be abolished and most of its area was supposed to go to a re-created Chalmers electorate. Based on consultation feedback, the Port Chalmers Borough became part of the  electorate. With such a geographic change, the proposed name of Chalmers electorate was no longer viable and the electorate name Dunedin North changed to North Dunedin instead.

Thomas Dick was elected on 17 March 1866 and resigned on 15 October 1866. He successfully contested the 15 December , but resigned again on 26 April 1867.

James Macandrew died in February 1887 whilst holding the electorate. The  was won by James Mills. The  was contested by Mills and James Green, with Mills being successful.

James Dickson represented Chalmers for four parliamentary terms from the  until 1928, when he retired. In both elections, Ansell was challenged by Labour's Norman Hartley Campbell. Campbell had already won the nomination as the Labour candidate for the  against M. Connolly, when he died in February 1935 following an operation. The Labour Party hierarchy wanted to make Connolly their candidate, but there was resentment and a new ballot was held, which was won by Archie Campbell, the brother of Norman Hartley Campbell. Archie Campbell defeated Ansell with the swing to Labour in the 1935 election, but retired in 1938.

The electorate was represented by seven Members of Parliament from 1866 to 1896, and a further five MPs from 1902 to 1938. At the 1937 redistribution the electorate was split between Dunedin Central,  and  electorates.

Members of Parliament

Key

Election results

1935 election

1931 election

1928 election

1902 election

1893 election

1890 election

1878 by-election

1867 by-election

Notes

References

Historical electorates of New Zealand
1865 establishments in New Zealand
1902 establishments in New Zealand
1896 disestablishments in New Zealand
1938 disestablishments in New Zealand
Politics of Otago